The 2015 San Jose State Spartans football team represented San Jose State University in the 2015 NCAA Division I FBS football season. The Spartans were led by third-year head coach Ron Caragher and played their home games at Spartan Stadium. They were members of the Mountain West Conference in the West Division. They finished the season 6–7, 4–4 in Mountain West play to finish in a tie for second place in the West Division. Though they finished 5–7 on the regular season, they qualified for a bowl berth due to having the third highest eligible Academic Progress Rate (APR), after only 77 of the 80 bids for a bowl were filled. This was San Jose's first bowl berth since 2012. The Spartans defeated Georgia State 27–16 to win the inaugural Cure Bowl.

Personnel

Roster

Schedule

Schedule Source:

Game summaries

New Hampshire

at Air Force

at Oregon State

Fresno State

at Auburn

at UNLV

San Diego State

New Mexico

BYU

at Nevada

at Hawaii

Boise State

Georgia State–Cure Bowl

References

San Jose State
San Jose State Spartans football seasons
Cure Bowl champion seasons
San Jose State Spartans football